The City of Peterborough is a unitary authority district with city status in the ceremonial county of Cambridgeshire, England. The area is named after its largest settlement, Peterborough but also covers a wider area of outlying villages and hamlets. 

Historically the area was split into parts between the counties of Northamptonshire, Isle of Ely and Huntingdonshire until 1974 when it became part of the short-lived county of Huntingdon and Peterborough before becoming part of the ceremonial county of Cambridgeshire. Located in the East Anglia region of England, the area borders the surrounding counties of Lincolnshire and Northamptonshire. The population of the district was 202,259 making it the second-largest district by population in East Anglia (After Norwich).

The district was also part of the Soke of Peterborough and was a Saxon settlement during the Anglo-Saxon era. The district also includes outlying villages such as Thorney, Old Fletton, Werrington, Parnwell, Dogsthorpe, Eye Green, Glinton, Northborough, Maxey, Wittering, Wansford and Ailsworth. The district also forms part of a built up area around the neighbouring settlements of Yaxley, Whittlesey, Alwalton, Crowland and Market Deeping.

Administration

Parliamentary seat 

The city formed a parliamentary borough returning two members from 1541, with the rest of the Soke being part of Northamptonshire parliamentary county. The Great Reform Act did not affect the borough, although the remaining, rural portion of the Soke was transferred to the northern division of Northamptonshire. In 1885, the borough's representation was reduced to one member, and in 1918, the boundaries were adjusted to include the whole Soke. Recent Members of Parliament for Peterborough have included the Conservative Sir Harmar Nicholls (1950–1974), Labour's Michael Ward (1974–1979), Conservative Brian Mawhinney (1979–1997), Labour's Helen Clark (1997–2005) and Conservative Stewart Jackson, from 2005. Fiona Onasanya won the 2017 general election for Labour; Onasanya was then expelled from the Labour party in December 2018, but kept her seat as an independent until being ejected on 1 May 2019 after a recall petition, triggering a by-election, which won by Labour's Lisa Forbes (June - November 2019). The current incumbent is Conservative Paul Bristow, who won the seat in the 2019 general election.

In 1997, the North West Cambridgeshire constituency was formed, incorporating parts of the city and neighbouring Huntingdonshire. The sitting member is the Conservative Shailesh Vara, who succeeded Sir Brian Mawhinney, former Secretary of State for Transport and Chairman of the Conservative Party, in 2005. Mawhinney, who had previously served as Member of Parliament for Peterborough from 1979, was created Baron Mawhinney of Peterborough in the county of Cambridgeshire later that year.

Local government 

From 1889, the ancient Soke of Peterborough formed an administrative county in its own right with boundaries similar, although not identical, to the current unitary authority. The area however remained geographically part of Northamptonshire until 1965, when the Soke was merged with Huntingdonshire to form the county of Huntingdon and Peterborough. Following a review of local government in 1974, Huntingdon and Peterborough was abolished and the current district created by the merger of the Municipal Borough of Peterborough with Peterborough Rural District, Barnack Rural District, Thorney Rural District, Old Fletton Urban District and part of the Norman Cross Rural District, which had each existed since 1894. This became part of the non-metropolitan county of Cambridgeshire. Letters patent were granted continuing the status of city over the greater area. In 1998, the city became autonomous of Cambridgeshire county council as a unitary authority, but it continues to form part of that county for ceremonial purposes. The leader and cabinet model of decision-making, first adopted by the city council in 2001, is similar to national government.

Policing in the city remains the responsibility of Cambridgeshire Constabulary; and firefighting, the responsibility of Cambridgeshire Fire and Rescue Service. The Peterborough Volunteer Fire Brigade, founded in 1884, is unique in the United Kingdom in that it functions as a retained fire station, under the control of the county fire and rescue service, but with unpaid firefighters. The Royal Anglian Regiment serves as the county regiment for Cambridgeshire. Peterborough formed its first territorial army unit, the 6th Northamptonshire Rifle Volunteer Corps, in 1860.

Health service 
Following the Health and Social Care Act 2012, Cambridgeshire and Peterborough Clinical Commissioning Group became the main commissioner of health services in the city. Adult social care functions of NHS Peterborough transferred back to the city council in 2012 and public health transferred in 2013. The responsibility of guided primary care services (general practitioners, dentists, opticians and pharmacists) transferred to NHS England. In 2017 the responsibility for commissioning Primary Care Services transferred back to the CCG. Cambridgeshire and Peterborough is one of the largest CCGs in the England with over 984,000 registered patients, 91 GP practices and a budget of £1.16bn in 2017–18. Although predominately providing health services in Cambridgeshire and Peterborough the CCG also has practices in both Hertfordshire and Northamptonshire.

Previously, NHS Peterborough (the public-facing name of Peterborough Primary Care Trust) guided primary care services in the city, directly provided adult social care and services in the community such as health visiting and physiotherapy and also funded hospital care and other specialist treatments. Prior to the formation of the PCT, the North West Anglia Healthcare NHS Trust provided health functions within the city and before that, Peterborough Health Authority.

Peterborough and Stamford Hospitals NHS Foundation Trust became one of the first ten English NHS foundation trusts in 2004 and in 2017, merged with Hinchingbrooke Health Care NHS Trust to form North West Anglia NHS Foundation Trust. Although a £300 million health investment plan has seen the transfer of the city's two hospitals into a single site, the Trust has been plagued by financial problems since the move. The full planning application for the redevelopment of the former Edith Cavell Hospital was approved by the council in 2006. Planning permission for the development of an integrated care centre on the site of the former Fenland Wing at Peterborough District Hospital was granted in 2003. The City Care Centre finally opened in 2009 and the first patients were treated at the new Peterborough City Hospital in 2010. The private Fitzwilliam Hospital run by Ramsay Health Care UK is situated in the landscaped grounds of the Milton Estate. Cambridgeshire and Peterborough NHS Foundation Trust, a designated University of Cambridge teaching trust, provides services to those who suffer from mental health problems. Following merger of the Cambridgeshire Ambulance Service in 1994, then the East Anglian Ambulance NHS Trust in 2006, the East of England Ambulance Service NHS Trust is responsible for the provision of statutory emergency medical services (EMS) in Peterborough. The East Anglian Air Ambulance provides helicopter EMS across the region.

Public utilities 
The council's budget for the financial year 2018–19 is £418.7 million. The main source of non-school funding is the formula grant, which is paid by central government to local authorities based on the services they provide. This was reduced by nearly 40% during the course of the 2010-15 parliament. The remainder, to which the police and fire authorities (and parish council where this exists) set a precept, is raised from council tax and business rates. This amounts to £59.5 million in 2015–16. Mains water and sewerage services are provided by Anglian Water, a former nationalised industry and natural monopoly, privatised in 1989 and now regulated by OFWAT.

Following deregulation, the consumer has a choice of energy supplier. Electricity was formerly provided by Eastern Electricity, which was privatised in 1990. In 2002, the supply business was sold to Powergen (now E.ON UK) and the distribution rights to EDF Energy who sold them to UK Power Networks in 2010. Natural gas was (and still is) supplied by British Gas, which was privatised in 1986; distribution (and gas and electricity transmission) is the responsibility of the National Grid, having been demerged as Transco in 1997. These industries are regulated by OFGEM. Peterborough Power Station is a 367 MWe gas-fired plant in Fengate operated by Centrica Energy.

British Telecommunications, privatised in 1984, provides fixed ADSL enabled (8 Mbit/s) telephone lines. Local loop unbundling, giving other internet service providers direct access, is completed at four out of 12 exchanges. The city is cabled by Virgin Media (previously Peterborough Cablevision, Cable & Wireless and NTL). These businesses are regulated by OFCOM. Cambridgeshire County Council and Peterborough City Council are embarking on a superfast broadband project to deliver access to improved connectivity to areas where it is acknowledged that the market is unlikely to deliver.

Civil parishes 
The district contains the unparished areas of Peterborough, Old Fletton and Stanground North and 29 civil parishes:

 Ailsworth
 Bainton
 Barnack
 Borough Fen
 Bretton
 Castor
 Deeping Gate
 Etton
 Eye
 Glinton
 Hampton Hargate and Vale
 Helpston
 Marholm
 Maxey
 Newborough
 Northborough
 Orton Longueville
 Orton Waterville
 Peakirk
 Southorpe
 St Martin's Without
 Sutton
 Thorney
 Thornhaugh
 Ufford
 Upton
 Wansford
 Wittering
 Wothorpe

Demographics

Ethnicity

Religion

Local landmarks
The district contains many notable attractions and landmarks including: Peterborough Cathedral, Burghley House, Nene Valley Railway, and Longthorpe Tower.

References

 
Non-metropolitan districts of Cambridgeshire
Unitary authority districts of England
Boroughs in England